The Sputter Gun was a prototype test gun using 7 major components from the WW2 era British Sten submachine gun carbine, along with other specially fabricated parts to make a complete operational firearm. It was designed to circumvent the existing U.S. Federal law defining a machine gun. The Sputter Gun, lacking any trigger, was designed to fire multiple rounds automatically, upon release of the bolt from its safety slot, until all ammunition was expended from the magazine. The Sputter Gun has never been classified as a machine gun by the ATF Firearms Technical Branch. Previous references to this in public records are in error or without substantiation.

Background
In 1983, the ATF became aware that, William M. York, doing business as York Arms Co., was offering for sale a version of a Mk.II Sten that was capable of fully automatic fire that did not meet the Federal definition as a machine gun. York advertised the “Sputter Gun” (so named by his attorney friend Ron Boutwell) as a firearm for those "who want the fun and excitement of owning and firing a fully automatic firearm without the government tax and red tape." A then employee, Chuck Lanum, of the ATF Firearms Technology Branch (FTB) in Wash. D.C. made a scheduled personal visit to the York Arms Co. in Hurricane, Utah, to inspect and discuss some of the Sten based firearms the company was manufacturing under their Class 2 FFL issued by the ATF. York had in attendance at this meeting with Lanum both an attorney and a court reporter. During that meeting Lanum offered his opinion that the Sputter Gun might be considered a “machine gun” under Federal law if a person's finger could be considered the “trigger” of the firearm. Lanum's opinion was scoffed at by all other's at the meeting and that opinion has never been again uttered or heard by anybody else at the meeting or from anybody else from the Federal Government.

Classification
The Sputter Gun has never been classified or reclassified as a Machine Gun by ATF or any other organization of the Federal Government and thus has never been "outlawed."

The US Congress defined a machine gun in the 1934 National Firearms Act

...any weapon which shoots, is designed to shoot, or can be readily restored to shoot, automatically more than one shot, without manual reloading, by a single function of the trigger.

In spite of assertions by ATF or others this legal definition has never been changed by any Ruling or Congress and still stands as Federal law.

See also
Gun politics in the United States
Firearm action

References

9mm Parabellum submachine guns